Kostas Karagiannis (1932 – 17 February 1993) was a Greek film director. He directed more than a hundred films from 1960 to 1991.

Selected filmography

References

External links
 
 Entry in old greek cinema

1932 births
1993 deaths
Greek film directors
Film people from Athens